The Monobob competition at the IBSF World Championships 2023 was held on 28 and 29 January 2023.

Results
The first two runs are started on 28 January at 09:00 and on 29 January at 10:00.

References

Monobob